Saeculum obscurum ("the dark age/century"), also known as the Pornocracy or the Rule of the Harlots, was a period in the history of the Papacy during the first two-thirds of the 10th century, following the chaos after the death of Pope Formosus in 896 which saw seven or eight papal elections in as many years.  It began with the installation of Pope Sergius III in 904 and lasted for sixty years until the death of Pope John XII in 964. During this period, the popes were influenced strongly by a powerful and allegedly corrupt aristocratic family, the Theophylacti, and their relatives and allies. The era is seen as one of the lowest points of the history of the Papal office.

Periodisation

The saeculum obscurum was first named and identified as a period of papal immorality by the Italian cardinal and  historian Caesar Baronius in his Annales Ecclesiastici in the sixteenth century. Baronius's primary source for his history of this period was a contemporaneous writer, Bishop Liutprand of Cremona. Baronius himself was writing during the Counter-Reformation, a period of heightened sensitivity to clerical corruption. His characterisation of the early 10th-century papacy was perpetuated by Protestant authors. The terms "pornocracy" (from Greek pornokratiā, "rule of prostitutes"); hetaerocracy ("government of mistresses"); and the Rule of the Harlots were coined by Protestant German theologians in the nineteenth century.

Historian Will Durant refers to the period from 867 to 1049 as the " of the papacy".

10th-century popes

The Theophylacti family sprung from Theophylactus. They held positions of increased importance in the Roman nobility, such as iudex ("judge"), vestararius, gloriosissimus dux ("most-glorious duke"), consul, senator, and magister militum. Theophylact's wife Theodora and daughter Marozia held a great influence over the papal selection and religious affairs in Rome through conspiracies, affairs, and marriages.

Marozia became the concubine of 45-year-old Pope Sergius III when she was 15 and later took other lovers and husbands. She ensured that her son John (who was rumoured to have been fathered by Sergius III) was seated as Pope John XI according to Antapodosis sive Res per Europam gestae (958–962), by Liutprand of Cremona (c. 920–972). Liutprand affirms that Marozia arranged the murder of her former lover Pope John X (who had originally been nominated for office by Theodora) through her then husband Guy of Tuscany possibly to secure the elevation of her current favourite as Pope Leo VI. There is no record substantiating that Pope John X had definitely died before Leo VI was elected since John X was already imprisoned by Marozia and was out of public view.

Theodora and Marozia held great sway over the popes during this time. In particular, as political rulers of Rome they had effective control over the election of new popes. Much that is alleged about the saeculum obscurum comes from the histories of Liutprand, Bishop of Cremona. Liutprand took part in the Assembly of Bishops which deposed Pope John XII and was a political enemy of the Roman aristocracy and its control over papal elections. Lindsay Brook writes:

List of popes during the saeculum obscurum

 Pope Sergius III (904–911), alleged lover of Marozia
 Pope Anastasius III (911–913)
 Pope Lando (913–914)
 Pope John X (914–928), alleged lover of Theodora (the mother), allegedly killed by Marozia
 Pope Leo VI (928–928)
 Pope Stephen VII (928–931)
 Pope John XI (931–935), son of Marozia, alleged son of Pope Sergius III
 Pope Leo VII (936–939)
 Pope Stephen VIII (939–942)
 Pope Marinus II (942–946)
 Pope Agapetus II (946–955)
 Pope John XII (955–964), grandson of Marozia, by her son Alberic II of Spoleto

Family tree

The Tusculan Papacy, 1012–1059

After several Crescentii family popes up to 1012, the Theophylacti still occasionally nominated sons as popes:
 Pope Benedict VIII (1012–1024), son of Count Gregory I
 Pope John XIX (1024–1032), son of Count Gregory I
 Pope Benedict IX (1032–1044, 1045, and 1047–1048), son of Alberic III
 Antipope Benedict X (1058–1059), son of Alberic III, driven out of Rome after a small war

Pope Benedict IX went so far as to sell the Papacy to his religious godfather, Pope Gregory VI (1045–1046). Benedict IX then changed his mind, seized the Lateran Palace, and became Pope for the third time in 1047–1048.

The Tusculan Papacy was finally ended by the election of Pope Nicholas II  five years after the Great Schism of 1054  who was assisted by Hildebrand of Sovana against Antipope Benedict X. Hildebrand was elected Pope Gregory VII in 1073 and introduced the Gregorian Reforms, increasing the power and independence of the papacy that would lead to help ignite the First Crusade in about 20 years.

See also
 The Bad Popes
 List of sexually active popes
 Papal appointment
 Pope Joan (fictional; legends about her may have stemmed from stories about the Pornocracy)

Notes

References
 Church and Society in a Crisis Age: Tenth and Eleventh Century Europe by Harlie Kay Gallatin.
 The Catholic Encyclopedia entry on Liutprand of Cremona

Historical eras
Lists of Catholic popes
History of the papacy
10th-century Christianity
Women and the papacy
Medieval Rome
10th century in the Papal States
Dark ages